Rutherford Township is one of six townships in Martin County, Indiana, United States. As of the 2010 census, its population was 760 and it contained 309 housing units.

Geography

Unincorporated towns
 South Martin at

Cemeteries
The township contains Holtsclaw, Truelove, White River, Inman, South Martin, and Mount Zion Cemeteries.

Major highways
  U.S. Route 231

School districts
 Loogootee Community School Corporation

Political districts
 Indiana's 8th congressional district
 State House District 63
 State Senate District 48

References
 
 United States Census Bureau 2008 TIGER/Line Shapefiles
 IndianaMap

External links
 Indiana Township Association
 United Township Association of Indiana
 City-Data.com page for Rutherford Township

Townships in Martin County, Indiana
Townships in Indiana